The Tears of Saint Peter, Penitent Saint Peter or St. Peter Repentant is a c.1590 painting by El Greco, now in the National Museum of Art, Architecture and Design in Oslo, Norway. Other variants of the work are in the Bowes Museum, the El Greco Museum, Museo Soumaya and others.

References

Bibliography
 ÁLVAREZ LOPERA, José, El Greco, Madrid, Arlanza, 2005, Biblioteca «Descubrir el Arte», (colección «Grandes maestros»). 
 SCHOLZ-HÄNSEL, Michael, El Greco, Colonia, Taschen, 2003. .

1590s paintings
Paintings by El Greco
El Greco
Paintings in the collection of the National Gallery (Norway)